Pennington Gap is the most populous town in Lee County, Virginia, United States. The population was 1,781 at the 2010 census.

The Lee Regional Medical Center was in Pennington Gap until it closed in October 2013, and the United States Penitentiary, Lee is nearby.

The Pennington Gap post office was established in 1891.

Geography
Pennington Gap is located at  (36.756580, −83.029375).

According to the United States Census Bureau, the town has a total area of 1.5 square miles (3.9 km), all of it land.

Pennington Gap is located at the junction of U.S. Route 58A and U.S. Route 421.

Climate
The climate in this area is characterized by hot, humid summers and generally mild to cool winters.  According to the Köppen Climate Classification system, Pennington Gap has a humid subtropical climate, abbreviated "Cfa" on climate maps.

Demographics

At the 2000 census there were 1,781 people, 811 households, and 480 families living in the town. The population density was 1,174.0 people per square mile (452.4/km). There were 950 housing units at an average density of 626.2 per square mile (241.3/km).  The racial makeup of the town was 95.28% White, 3.43% African American, 0.39% Native American, 0.28% Asian, and 0.62% from two or more races. Hispanic or Latino of any race were 0.67%.

Of the 811 households 22.9% had children under the age of 18 living with them, 40.4% were married couples living together, 16.2% had a female householder with no husband present, and 40.8% were non-families. 37.5% of households were one person and 16.8% were one person aged 65 or older. The average household size was 2.15 and the average family size was 2.84.

The age distribution was 20.5% under the age of 18, 7.2% from 18 to 24, 25.4% from 25 to 44, 25.3% from 45 to 64, and 21.6% 65 or older. The median age was 42 years. For every 100 females, there were 81.4 males. For every 100 females age 18 and over, there were 74.6 males.

The median household income was $18,056 and the median family income  was $27,875. Males had a median income of $27,885 versus $18,625 for females. The per capita income for the town was $13,742. About 28.3% of families and 31.3% of the population were below the poverty line, including 42.0% of those under age 18 and 24.7% of those age 65 or over.

Government and infrastructure
The Federal Bureau of Prisons United States Penitentiary, Lee is located in the Lee County Industrial Park in unincorporated Lee County, Virginia, near Pennington Gap.

Education
Lee County Public Schools operates schools in the county.

Pennington Elementary School was located on Morgan Avenue, consisting of three buildings built at various times, 1912, 1917, and 1937.

In 1989, with the consolidation of many of the county's high schools at the newly constructed Lee High School, the old Pennington High School was converted into Pennington Middle School (grades 5–7).

Notable residents

Barry Audia, pro boxer
Claude Ely, preacher and songwriter
Jim Pankovits, pro baseball player
William C. Wampler, representative to the United States Congress
Carol S. Wood, mathematician

References

Towns in Lee County, Virginia
Towns in Virginia